École Française de Belgrade is an international French school in Belgrade, the capital of Serbia. It is composed of a preschool (maternelle), primary school (école primaire), junior high (collège), and high school (lycée). It was founded in 1951. Nowadays it has about 500 pupils and about 80 staff (as of 2018). It is located in Belgrade, in the neighborhood of Senjak.

External links

References 

 École Française de Belgrade. 02.02.2019.
 École Française - La France en Serbie 02.02.2019.

Educational institutions established in 1951
1951 establishments in Yugoslavia
International schools in Serbia
Schools in Belgrade
Belgrade